Gibbs is an unincorporated community in Longlaketon Rural Municipality No. 219, Saskatchewan, Canada. The community is located on Highway 20 about 25 km north of the town of Craven.

Gibbs was home to 3 permanent residents at the beginning of 2018.

See also

 List of communities in Saskatchewan
 List of ghost towns in Saskatchewan

References

External links
 Gibbs Cemetery
 Gibbs, Saskatchewan - Youtube

Longlaketon No. 219, Saskatchewan
Unincorporated communities in Saskatchewan
Ghost towns in Saskatchewan
Division No. 6, Saskatchewan